Sir Charles Lilley (27 August 1827 – 20 August 1897) was a Premier and Chief Justice of the Supreme Court of Queensland. He had a significant influence on the form and spirit of state education in colonial Queensland which lasted well into the 20th century.

Early life

Lilley was born in Newcastle upon Tyne, England, the son of Thomas Lilley and his wife Jane, née Shipley. Lilley was raised by his maternal grandfather and was educated at St Nicholas Parish School. Intending to study law, Lilley became articled to Newcastle solicitor, William Lockey Harle. Lilley was sent to the London office and studied at University College, London for two years. He gave this up, enlisted in the army and, while stationed at Preston, Lancashire, lectured on temperance and industry. This brought him into disfavour with his superior officers. Lilley spent 28 days in cells on a charge of being absence without leave. Friends purchased his honourable discharge. He remained at Preston and worked on the committee that established the Preston Free Library.

Lilley arrived at Sydney on 6 July 1856. Soon afterwards he travelled to Brisbane, joined the Crown Solicitor's Office, and finished his law degree. Thereafter, he took up journalism, acquired an interest in the Moreton Bay Courier (later the Brisbane Courier), and for two years was its editor.

Politics
Lilley was prominent in the movement for separation from New South Wales.  After Queensland separated, Lilley was elected by a majority of only three votes as the Member for Hamlet of Fortitude Valley to that state's first Legislative Assembly. Lilley held the seat of Fortitude Valley to February 1874, and was then returned for the seat of North Brisbane. 
	

Lilley was called to the bar in 1861. In September 1865 he succeeded John Bramston as Attorney-General in the first Herbert ministry, and held the same position in the Macalister ministry which succeeded it.  On 7 August 1866 he was again appointed Attorney-General for a second term before the ministry was defeated in August 1867. On 25 November 1868 Lilley became Premier of Queensland and served concurrently as Attorney-General, and then Colonial Secretary, for part of his premiership.  His most important work as Premier was the introduction of free education in January 1870. Queensland was the first of the Australian colonies to adopt this principle.

As a protest against the monopoly of the A.S.N. Company Lilley ordered three vessels to be constructed for the Queensland government at Sydney. One, the ship SS Governor Blackall, designed by Norman Selfe, was built and as a result the A.S.N. Company reduced its charges.  Lilley, however, had acted without reference to his colleagues and was censured by all but one of his followers. In May 1870 his party was defeated at the polls, the Palmer ministry succeeding Lilley's government. He was elected leader of the opposition. In January 1874, Macalister carried a vote of no confidence in the Government, and offered to stand aside so that Lilley could become Premier. He declined office of any kind, but shortly afterwards accepted the position of acting judge of the Supreme Court of Queensland. He became a puisne judge on 4 July 1874; on 24 June 1879, he succeeded Sir James Cockle as Chief Justice, a position he held until 13 March 1893.

Lilley's strong interest in education was a significant factor in the establishment of Brisbane Grammar School where the Lilley Gold Medal and the Lilley Silver Medal are named in his honour.  The Lilley Centre opened in 2010 is also named after him. In 1891 he was chairman of a commission investigating the establishment of a university in Brisbane. In 1893, Lilley resigned his position as Chief Justice after Sir Thomas McIlwraith questioned publicly some of Lilley's financial transactions, and stood unsuccessfully against McIlwraith in the electorate of Brisbane North.

Later life
 
Lilley had a severe illness in 1896 and died in 1897. He was knighted in 1881.

Legacy
The Federal electorate of Lilley is named after him.

There is a statue of Sir Charles Lilley at the Speakers' Corner in King George Square in Brisbane.

Family

Lilley married Sarah Jane Jeays in 1858 and was survived by a large family including:

 Edwyn Mitford (1859–1911)
 Charles Bedell (1860–1918)
 Annie Mary (1862 – ?)
 Walter Preston (1863–1916)
 Harold Bedell (1864–1901)
 Arthur Shipley (1866–1948)

Sir Charles Lilley is the Great Great Grandfather of Comedian and TV Producer Chris Lilley (Summer Heights High, Angry Boys). Christopher Daniel Lilley's (1974–) father Ian Hugh Arthur Lilley (1939–1997) was the son of Ian Penfold Lilley (1916–1980) and Grandson of Arthur Shipley Lilley. (1866–1948)

See also
 Judiciary of Australia
 List of Judges of the Supreme Court of Queensland
 Members of the Queensland Legislative Assembly, 1860–1863; 1863–1867; 1867–1868; 1868–1870; 1870–1871; 1871–1873; 1873–1878

References

Lilley, Sir Charles — Brisbane City Council Grave Location Search

External links

1827 births
1897 deaths
People from Newcastle upon Tyne
Premiers of Queensland
Members of the Queensland Legislative Assembly
Australian Knights Bachelor
Chief Justices of Queensland
Alumni of University College London
English emigrants to Australia
People from Brisbane
Burials at Toowong Cemetery
Attorneys-General of Queensland
Colony of Queensland judges
Judges of the Supreme Court of Queensland
Colony of Queensland people
19th-century Australian politicians
19th-century Australian judges